Elaphidion cubae is a species of beetle in the family Cerambycidae. It was described by Warren Samuel Fisher in 1932.

References

cubae
Beetles of North America
Insects of Cuba
Insects of the Caribbean
Beetles described in 1932